Islas Líneas Aéreas, operating as Islas Airways, was an airline based in Tenerife, Spain, offering scheduled inter-island services in the Canary Islands out of Tenerife North Airport. It was established in 2002 and started operations in February 2003.

Islas Airways suspended all flight operations on October 16, 2012. The Supreme Court confirmed, within an administrative proceeding for the reimbursement of the subsidy that the Ministry of Development itself had initiated, in 2018, the judgment of instance that obliged Islas Airways to return 7.5 million euros, those amounts had already been withheld by the ministry itself so that the Judgment no longer had economic effects.

Destinations
Islas Airways operated scheduled services to the following destinations:

Arrecife - Lanzarote Airport
El Hierro - El Hierro Airport
Fuerteventura - Fuerteventura Airport
Las Palmas de Gran Canaria - Gran Canaria Airport hub
Santa Cruz de la Palma - La Palma Airport
Tenerife - Tenerife North Airport

Fleet 
As of January 2011, the Islas Airways fleet consisted of six ATR 72 turboprop aircraft (2 ATR72-202, 1 ATR72-212 and 3 new ATR72-500) with an average age of 4 years, each of which was equipped with 70 passenger seats in an all-economy class cabin layout.

References

External links

Defunct airlines of Spain
Airlines established in 2002
Airlines disestablished in 2012
Transport in the Canary Islands
2002 establishments in Spain
Companies of the Canary Islands